The 1972–73 Rheinlandliga was the 21st season of the highest amateur class of the Rhineland Football Association under the name of 1. Amateurliga Rheinland. It was a predecessor of today's Rheinlandliga.

Results
Last years relegation team from the Regional League, SpVgg Andernach, became Rhineland champion. SC Oberlahnstein represented Rhineland in the 1973 German Soccer Amateur Championship  and lost in the second round to the amateurs of 1. FC Kaiserslautern (Südwest). All three newcomers, Eintracht Höhr-Grenzhausen, Ahrweiler BC and SV Ehrang moved down 2. Amateur league. For the following 1973–74 season, SV Speicher, TuS Mayen and SV Ellingen came up from the 2. Amateur League, as well as a descendant from the Regional league, Eintracht Trier.

SC Oberlahnstein and SV Niederlahnstein merged after the season to become SG Eintracht Lahnstein.

References

1972 in association football
Football in Rhineland-Palatinate
1973 in association football